A vicar general  (previously, archdeacon) is the principal deputy of the bishop of a diocese for the exercise of administrative authority and possesses the title of local ordinary.  As vicar of the bishop, the vicar general exercises the bishop's ordinary executive power over the entire diocese and, thus, is the highest official in a diocese or other particular church after the diocesan bishop or his equivalent in canon law.

The title normally occurs only in Western Christian churches, such as the Latin Church of the Catholic Church and the Anglican Communion. Among the Eastern churches, the Mar Thoma Syrian Church of Kerala uses this title and remains an exception. The title for the equivalent officer in the Eastern churches is syncellus and protosyncellus.

The term is used by many religious orders of men in a similar manner, designating the authority in the Order after its Superior General.

Ecclesiastical structure

In the Roman Catholic Church, a diocesan bishop must appoint at least one vicar general for his diocese, but may appoint more—dioceses whose territory is split into different states usually have one each. The vicar general by virtue of office is the bishop's agent in administration, acting as second-in-command for diocesan executive matters. (A priest in a separate office, the judicial vicar, serves a similar role with regard to the exercise of ordinary judicial power of governance in the diocese which is normally exercised in ecclesiastical courts.) Vicars general must be priests, auxiliary bishops, or coadjutor bishops—if a coadjutor bishop exists for a diocese, the diocesan bishop is to appoint him as a vicar general. Other auxiliary bishops are usually appointed vicars general or at least episcopal vicars.  A vicar general is a local ordinary and, as such, acquires his powers by virtue of office and not by delegation.  He is to possess a doctorate or at least a licentiate in canon law (JCL, JCD) or theology (STL, STD) or be truly expert in these fields.

The similarly titled episcopal vicar shares in the bishop's ordinary executive power like the vicar general, except for the fact that the episcopal vicar's authority normally extends over only a particular geographic section of a diocese or over certain specific matters. These might include issues concerning religious institutes or the faithful of a different rite. These too must be priests or auxiliary bishops.  The equivalent officer in the Eastern Churches is called the syncellus.

Priests appointed as vicars general or episcopal vicars are freely appointed or removed by the diocesan bishop, and are appointed for a fixed duration. They lose their office when the term expires, or when the episcopal see falls vacant (sede vacante). Auxiliary bishops may also be removed from the office of vicar general, but must at least be appointed episcopal vicar. An auxiliary bishop who is an episcopal vicar, or a coadjutor bishop who is vicar general, may only be removed from office for a grave reason. Likewise, while they lose their vicar general or episcopal vicar office title sede vacante, they retain the powers of the office—specifically, those powers that can still be exercised while the see is vacant—until the succeeding bishop takes over the diocese. A coadjutor bishop has the right of succession, so if the see falls vacant he becomes the diocesan bishop immediately. These offices should not be confused with the vicar forane or "dean/archpriest", as such vicars do not have ordinary executive power.

The appointment of a vicar general is also a useful tool for a diocesan bishop who has additional functions attached to his episcopate. The most notable example is in the diocese of Rome. The Pope is 'ex officio' the diocesan bishop of Rome, but spends most of his time governing the Latin Church and the global Catholic Church. His vicar general therefore functions as the de facto bishop of the diocese. The Vicar General of Rome also serves the same role for the suburbicarian diocese of Ostia, the traditional see of the Dean of the College of Cardinals, ever since it was merged with the diocese of Rome. The Vicar General of Rome, who is normally a cardinal, known as the Cardinal Vicar, is one of the few church officials in Rome to remain in office sede vacante. The current Vicar General of Rome is Cardinal Angelo De Donatis.

A similar example is found in the United States. The archbishop of New York functioned also as ordinary of the military services from World War I until the 1980s: in addition to being responsible for the archdiocese of New York, the same archbishop was also responsible for the Military Ordinariate. This had the status of an apostolic vicariate, and functioned as the equivalent of a diocese defined by quality (that is, all Catholic members of the U.S. military and their dependents) rather than by geography. The archbishop had two separate administrations, therefore, and two sets of vicars general to manage each. This arrangement ended with the establishment of the wholly separate Archdiocese for the Military Services, USA.

Anglican

Vicars-General retain important administrative and judicial functions in the Church of England.

Following the Act of Supremacy of 1534, Henry VIII appointed Thomas Cromwell as his vicar general, a delegation of the powers with which Henry was invested by the Act as a result of becoming supreme head of the Church of England.

During the COVID-19 pandemic, the Church of England licensed bishop-designates as episcopal vicars until they were permitted to hold consecration services. For example, Gavin Collins was licensed as an episcopal vicar in the Diocese of Oxford from his original consecration date (28 January 2021) until his consecration as Bishop of Dorchester (14 April 2021).

See also
Appointment of Catholic bishops

References

Canon law of the Anglican Communion
Ecclesiastical titles
Catholic ecclesiastical titles